The 2011–12 San Diego Sockers season was the third season of the San Diego Sockers indoor soccer club as a franchise in the Professional Arena Soccer League. The Sockers, a Pacific Division team, played their home games in the Chevrolet Del Mar Arena in Del Mar, California. The team was perfect, winning every game played that season (28–0), including games in the Ron Newman Cup playoffs, & in the U.S. Open Cup & FIFRA Club Championship tournaments. The team was led to a 16–0 regular season (with 165 goals-for and just 78 goals-against) and a third consecutive league championship by head coach Phil Salvagio.

PASL schedule

Regular season

2012 Ron Newman Cup

Non-PASL schedule

2012 FIFRA Club Championship

2011–12 United States Open Cup for Arena Soccer

Awards

Team
 2012 Ron Newman Cup - PASL Champions
 2012 FIFRA Club Championship
 2011-12 United States Open Cup for Arena Soccer Champions
 2011-12 Best Record - PASL
 PASL Western Division Champions

Individual
 PASL MVP: Kraig Chiles - Forward
 PASL Coach of the Year: Phil Salvagio
 Ron Newman Cup MVP: Riley Swift - Goalkeeper
 All-League First Team: Brian Farber - Midfielder; Kraig Chiles - Forward
 All-League Second Team: Zé Roberto - Defender; Riley Swift - Goalkeeper

References

External links
San Diego Sockers official website

San Diego Sockers
San Diego Sockers seasons
San Diego Sockers 2011
San Diego Sockers 2011